This is a list of accredited institutes of higher education — e.g. universities, academies, colleges, seminaries, conservatories, and institutes of technology — located in, or near, Vatican City. More specifically, the buildings are in Rome: there are no universities inside the official boundaries of Vatican City, due to restricted public access such as border checkpoints and security checkpoints run by the Pontifical Swiss Guard or the Italian police. According to the Lateran Treaty, these buildings enjoy the same status, recognized by international law, as embassies and foreign diplomatic missions abroad. The areas occupied by the buildings are commonly known as extraterritorial.

There are about 65 educational institutions around Rome that address papal education and learning, including the most important ones concentrating on ecclesiastical faculties (Theology, Philosophy and Canon Law), which are known as Pontifical universities.

Accredited schools
 Pontifical universities in Rome

References

Vatican City
Vatican City
Universities

Universities